Josip Tadić (born 22 August 1987) is a Croatian professional footballer who plays as a striker.

Club career

Osijek and Bayer Leverkusen
Tadić started his professional career with NK Osijek in the 2004–05 Croatian First League season. After scoring 7 goals in 20 league appearances for the club, he moved to German Bundesliga side Bayer Leverkusen in the summer of 2005.

At Leverkusen, he mostly played for the reserve squad in the Regionalliga, the third tier of German football at the time, where he scored 6 goals in 25 appearances. His only Bundesliga appearance came on 17 December 2005 in a goalless draw at home to Hannover 96, where he came on as a substitute for Tranquillo Barnetta in the 85th minute.

Dinamo Zagreb
In the winter break of the 2006–07 Croatian First League season, Tadić signed a three-and-a-half-year contract with Dinamo Zagreb, the league's defending champions at the time. He scored five goals in 13 league appearances for the club until the end of the season, helping them to defend the title.

In his second season with Dinamo Zagreb, he scored 11 goals in 27 league appearances and helped the club to their third consecutive league title. He also featured regularly for the club in the European competition, making three appearances in the UEFA Champions League qualifying and five in the UEFA Cup. On 24 July 2007, he scored the final goal in a 3–1 extra-time win at home to FK Khazar Lankaran in the Champions League qualifying, which was his only goal in the European competition that season. On 10 May 2008, he scored a hat-trick in his side's 6–1 win at home to NK Rijeka, their final league match of the season.

His third season with the club saw him scoring just four goals in 22 league appearances, with all of the four goals coming before the winter break. The club nevertheless won their fourth consecutive league title at the end of the season. He also made 7 appearances in the European competition that season, scoring his only goal in a 3–0 away win at NK Domžale in the Champions League qualifying on 30 July 2008.

Grenoble
On 4 July 2009, Tadić signed a four-year contract with French Ligue 1 side Grenoble Foot 38. He made his league debut in the club's opening match of the season, a 2–0 defeat at home to Olympique de Marseille on 8 August 2009.

On 11 September 2009, it was announced that Tadić would be sidelined in order to undergo surgery for an ankle injury received during a friendly match against Servette the previous week. He made his league comeback on 16 January 2010 in a 2–1 defeat at home to AS Saint-Étienne. He made a total of 14 league appearances in his first season with Grenoble, without scoring a goal.

Tadić stayed at the club following their relegation to the Ligue 2 at the end of the 2009–10 season. However, after making just five appearances in the league, again without scoring a goal, he was allowed to leave the club on a free transfer in the winter break of the 2010–11 season.

Arminia Bielefeld
On 30 December 2010, German 2. Bundesliga side Arminia Bielefeld announced Tadić as their latest signing. The striker signed a six-month contract, would will be automatically extended for another season if the team avoids relegation.

He made his league debut for the club on 16 January 2011 in a 1–1 draw at home to FSV Frankfurt. On 30 January 2011, he scored his first goal for Arminia Bielefeld in the club's 3–1 defeat at home to Hertha BSC.

AC Omonia
On 14 July 2011, Tadić completed his transfer to the Cypriot club AC Omonia, on a free transfer. At the transfer deadline (31 August) of the same summer his contract was released because he wasn't good enough for the team and the coach.

Lechia Gdańsk
In August 2011, he joined Lechia Gdańsk on a two-year contract.

Melbourne Heart
On 14 July 2012 it was announced he had signed with Australian A-League club Melbourne Heart.

Rijeka
On 4 June 2013, Tadić had signed a two-year contract with Croatia's top tier outfit, Rijeka.

Kitchee
On 12 July 2018, Tadić was presented as a player for Hong Kong Premier League side Kitchee. In June 2019 he left the club.

International career
From 2002 and 2008, Tadić won 49 caps and scored 9 goals as a Croatian youth international, representing the country from under-15 to under-21. He debuted for the Croatian national under-21 team on 9 February 2005 in a friendly against Israel and went on to make 22 appearances and score 5 goals at that level, with his last appearance coming in a friendly against Hungary on 26 March 2008, where he scored a goal.

He has yet to feature for the Croatia.

Honours

Club
Kitchee
 Hong Kong Senior Shield: 2018–19
 Hong Kong FA Cup: 2018–19

Sūduva
 A Lyga: 2019
 Lithuanian Football Cup: 2019

References

External links
 
 
 League stats at hnl-statistika.com 

1987 births
Living people
Sportspeople from Đakovo
Association football forwards
Croatian footballers
Croatia youth international footballers
Croatia under-21 international footballers
NK Osijek players
Bayer 04 Leverkusen players
Bayer 04 Leverkusen II players
GNK Dinamo Zagreb players
Grenoble Foot 38 players
Arminia Bielefeld players
Lechia Gdańsk players
Melbourne City FC players
HNK Rijeka players
NK Zadar players
SK Sturm Graz players
Balıkesirspor footballers
NK Slaven Belupo players
FK Sūduva Marijampolė players
Kitchee SC players
FK Žalgiris players
Bundesliga players
Ligue 1 players
Ligue 2 players
Ekstraklasa players
A-League Men players
Austrian Football Bundesliga players
Croatian Football League players
TFF First League players
A Lyga players
Hong Kong Premier League players
Croatian expatriate footballers
Expatriate footballers in Germany
Croatian expatriate sportspeople in Germany
Expatriate footballers in France
Croatian expatriate sportspeople in France
Expatriate footballers in Poland
Croatian expatriate sportspeople in Poland
Expatriate soccer players in Australia
Croatian expatriate sportspeople in Australia
Expatriate footballers in Austria
Croatian expatriate sportspeople in Austria
Expatriate footballers in Turkey
Croatian expatriate sportspeople in Turkey
Expatriate footballers in Lithuania
Croatian expatriate sportspeople in Lithuania
Expatriate footballers in Hong Kong
Croatian expatriate sportspeople in Hong Kong